Obere Gottesackerwände is a mountain located in Bavaria, Germany.

Mountains of Bavaria
Mountains of the Alps